John Albert Russell (October 20, 1895 in San Mateo, California – November 19, 1930 in Ely, Nevada) was a pitcher in Major League Baseball. He pitched in six games for Brooklyn Robins in the 1917 and 1918 seasons and then in fifteen games for the Chicago White Sox in 1921–1922.

In 1918 Russell served in the military during World War I.

External links

1895 births
1930 deaths
Baseball players from California
Major League Baseball pitchers
Brooklyn Robins players
Chicago White Sox players
Vancouver Beavers players
Rochester Hustlers players
Spokane Indians players
Sioux City Packers players
Kansas City Blues (baseball) players